Timothy John Norton SVD (born 24 July 1958) is an Australian Catholic bishop. He has served as an Auxiliary Bishop of the Roman Catholic Archdiocese of Brisbane since 2022. A member of the Society of the Divine Word, he previously served as the Provincial Superior of the order for Australia between 2005 and 2013.

Early life 
Norton was born in Sydney in 1958 to Joseph and Dawn Norton (née Spillane). He has an older brother Chris and a younger sister, Julie. He attended Marist Brothers Eastwood, where the school's chaplain was a Divine Word Missionary who had previously lived in India for 30 years. He took a trip to India during his final year of high school, which he later said was influential in discerning his vocation. After graduating, he commenced tertiary studies for a Bachelor of Applied Science in Physiotherapy at Cumberland College of Health Sciences, Sydney. He worked as a physiotherapist and worked with young street people in Darlinghurst who were experiencing homelessness, addiction, and mental health issues.

He entered the seminary when he was 25 and moved to Mexico to continue his studies at the age of 28. In 1985, he entered the Society of the Divine Word and in 1990, professed his final vows.

Priesthood 
Norton was ordinated a priest at St Kevins, Eastwood on 2 March 1991. Immediately following his ordination, he returned to Mexico City to serve as parish vicar until 1996. He became the director of the SILOAM Spiritual Programme between 1997 and 1998. He then served as head of formation and prefect of the Scholastics in Melbourne (1998-2000, 2002–2004) and director of the noviciate in Sydney (2001-2002).

From 2005 to 2013, Norton served as the Provincial Superior for Australia for the Society of the Divine Word. From 2014, until his episcopal appointment, he was the head of formation and director of the Ad Gentes Centre in Nemi, Italy.

Episcopate
Norton was appointed Auxiliary Bishop of Brisbane by Pope Francis on 11 November 2021, and was given the titular see of Madaurus in Algeria. He was consecrated by Archbishop Mark Coleridge on 22 February 2022, in the Cathedral of St Stephen, Brisbane.

References 

Living people
1958 births
Australian bishops
Roman Catholic bishops of Sydney
21st-century Roman Catholic bishops in Australia